Stonehouse Hospital is a health facility in Strathaven Road, Stonehouse, South Lanarkshire, Scotland. It is managed by NHS Lanarkshire.

History
The original facility, which was designed by Alexander Cullen as an infectious diseases hospital, was completed in 1896. It was expanded in 1916 and, after joining the National Health Service in 1948, it became a community hospital. A modern low-rise facility was procured under the private finance initiative in 2001. The new facility, which was built by Dawn Construction at a cost of £4.3 million, was completed in 2004.

References

1896 establishments in Scotland
Hospitals established in 1896
Hospital buildings completed in 2004
NHS Scotland hospitals
Hospitals in South Lanarkshire
NHS Lanarkshire
Stonehouse, South Lanarkshire